The West Indies women's cricket team toured Sri Lanka in February and March 2013. They played against Sri Lanka in three One Day Internationals and five Twenty20 Internationals, winning the ODI series 2–1 and winning the T20I series 4–1. The tour followed both sides' participation in the 2012 ICC Women's World Twenty20.

Squads

WODI Series

1st ODI

2nd ODI

3rd ODI

WT20I Series

1st T20I

2nd T20I

3rd T20I

4th T20I

5th T20I

See also
 2012 ICC Women's World Twenty20

References

External links
West Indies Women tour of Sri Lanka 2012/13 from Cricinfo

International cricket competitions in 2013
2013 in women's cricket
Women's international cricket tours of Sri Lanka
West Indies women's cricket team tours